Platythrips is a genus of insects belonging to the family Thripidae.

The species of this genus are found in Estonia.

Species:
 Platythrips tunicatus (Haliday, 1852)

References

Thripidae
Thrips genera